The 2007 FedEx Cup Playoffs were held from August 23 to September 16. They consisted of four events. The events in order are The Barclays, Deutsche Bank Championship, BMW Championship and The Tour Championship. These were the first FedEx Cup playoffs being held. Tiger Woods won the playoffs and took home $10,000,000.

The point distribution can be seen here.

Regular season rankings

For the full list see here

The Barclays
The Barclays was played August 23–26. 144 players were eligible to play but 6 of them did not enter. Of the 138 players who entered the tournament, 75 of them made the cut. The cut was even par. Steve Stricker won by shooting −16 to win the first ever FedEx Cup playoff event. Tiger Woods did not participate in the tournament. The top 120 players in the points standings advanced to the Deutsche Bank Championship.

Full leaderboard

Deutsche Bank Championship
The Deutsche Bank Championship was played from August 31 to September 3. 120 players were eligible to play but 4 of them did not enter. Of the 116 players who entered the tournament, 75 of them made the cut. The cut was 1 over-par. Phil Mickelson won by shooting −16. Tiger Woods finished tied for 2nd, two strokes behind Mickelson. The top 70 players in the points standings advanced to the BMW Championship.

Full leaderboard

BMW Championship
The BMW Championship was played September 6–9. 70 players were eligible to play but three of them did not enter. There was no cut for this tournament. Tiger Woods won by shooting −22. This was Tiger's 60th win on the PGA Tour. The top 30 players in the points standings advanced to The Tour Championship.

Full leaderboard

The Tour Championship
The Tour Championship was played September 13–16. All 30 players eligible to play did so. There was no cut for this tournament. Tiger Woods won by shooting −23. This was Tiger's 61st win on the PGA Tour. He also won the FedEx Cup.

Full leaderboard

Final leaderboard

For the full list see here

Table of qualifying players

Table key:

FedEx Cup
FedEx Cup Playoffs